Bundesstraße 178 (B178) is a German federal highway in the east of Saxony. It was built as a dual carriageway, and the highway connects with the motorway A4 near the city of Weißenberg in Saxony. It ends in Zittau to the Polish border. After crossing the Polish border, the road reaches the Czech border after a few kilometres, where the Czech dual-carriageway R35 begins. In the future the road will be an international corridor in Central Europe, connecting Germany with the west of Poland (Lower Silesian Voivodeship) and the Czech Republic.

Bundesstraße
Roads in Saxony